Judaai is a 1997 Indian Hindi language romantic comedy drama film directed by Raj Kanwar. It stars Anil Kapoor, Sridevi and Urmila Matondkar. Kader Khan, Farida Jalal, Johnny Lever, Paresh Rawal, Upasana Singh and Saeed Jaffrey feature in supporting roles. Poonam Dhillon makes a special appearance. A remake of the 1994 Telugu film Subhalagnam, the plot revolves around the travails of a greedy wife Kajal (Sridevi), who lured by wealth, convinces her husband (Kapoor) to marry a second time.

Upon release, the film was a major commercial success grossing ₹28.77 crores against its ₹6.30 crores budget, becoming the Eighth highest grossing Indian film of 1997. The film was widely praised for the performances of the lead actresses.

Some of the movie was filmed in Thun, Switzerland for unclear reasons.

Plot 

Kajal Verma marries engineer Raj Verma. She and her dad Rakshwant assume that he is wealthy and corrupt. Rakshwant is happy that Kajal does not have in-laws, and she'll get to rule the roost in her new house. But in reality, Raj doesn't have air-conditioner, car, not even refrigerator. This infuriates Kajal. In her mind, she creates a separate world where she is rich, wealthy, has several cars and lives lavishly in a big bungalow. She is pregnant.

7 years later

She and Raj have twin children: Romi and Preeti. But still Kajal's mind isn't changed. She meets her old wealthy friend Nisha, lying that Raj is a business magnate, her family owns several cars and have a big bungalow. Nisha offers to give her lift. Kajal is exposed when the bungalow she points out as her own turns out to be Nisha's.

Coming from overseas, Raj's boss Randhir's niece Jahnvi learns he is an engineer working for Randhir's construction company. Enters Vikram Khanna, a handsome guy and his business partner. At a guest house, he tries to rape Jahnvi but Raj arrives and saves her. She falls in love with him.

When she learns that he is a married man, she is adamant about marrying him. Unaware that Kajal is Raj's wife, Jahnvi accidentally meets her. She confesses her love to Kajal and Raj, which angers them.

To marry Raj, Jahnvi meets greedy Kajal inside a temple and offers 2 crore rupees in exchange for marriage to Raj. Then Kajal, seeing this as her chance to gain wealth, suddenly accepts her proposal. Kajal forces Raj into the agreement. Reluctant, Raj marries Jahnvi. Kajal divorces him herself, to comply with the Hindu Marriage Act; thinking that she and Jahnvi will happily live together and share Raj.

She then uses the money she got in the bargain to buy a huge mansion and cars. The bungalow she buys ends up being that of Nisha. She briefly returns to her old home to collect a picture of her husband. Kajal then proceeds to taunt her that she has fulfilled her dreams, whereas Nisha's dreams are now shattered having lost everything. Nisha reminds Kajal that she sold her house and possessions to pay for the treatment of her ill husband, whereas Kajal has sold her husband for riches; and that to some extent, Kajal is all the poorer for that. Kajal moulds herself into a socialite and this leads to Kajal neglecting her family. Raj initially feels rejected by Kajal and does not get close to Jahnvi, feeling objectified at the thought of being bought and sold between his two wives. But the children and Raj find companionship with Jahnvi, who showers them with love and affection. She changes herself and becomes a typical middle-class type Indian housewife. She gets up early, does pooja, and then cooks tasty food for her family. She does not mind tiring herself all day learning new dishes and rituals as she finds solace in this quiet, peaceful life.

She even travels happily in crowded buses and autos to make Raaj and the kids feel secure and happy around her. She abandons all the luxury and comforts she grew up with. The children call Jahnvi "Maa", something that Kajal would previously reprimand her children for calling her; insisting that they call her "Mummy" as this sounded high society.

Now Kajal realizes how far she has drifted from her family. She forgets her wedding anniversary and throws a birthday party for her daughter's birthday, not realizing that Raj has never been attracted to a lavish lifestyle and thus further pushing him away from her and towards Jahnvi. After frequent reminders from her mother, Kajal tries to make amends. When nothing works, Kajal shocks her husband when she slaps Jahnvi and accuses her of stealing her husband and tries to make Jahnvi leave. Kajal offers Jahnvi all her money back in exchange for Raj again, only to be told by Raj that she is the poorest relation despite having all the riches she ever dreamed of. On the advice of her friend, Kajal seeks legal advice which also states that the only way she can legally marry Raj if he and Jahnvi divorce – an impossible task. She then forcibly tries to throw Jahnvi out of the house, but to no avail, as Raj decides to leave with Jahnvi claiming that in the present circumstances, this is the fairest thing to do. The kids decide to stay with Janhvi and their father – heartbroken as they learn that their father was sold, prompting the son to ask Kajal about the prospect of them being sold to another family at an agreed price.

Kajal on the other hand, distraught by her family abandoning her, donates all her riches, to pay her dues. When she learns that Raj and the kids are leaving for the US, she runs to the airport for one final visit. She finds them ready to depart. But at the last minute, Jahnvi turns to Raj and tells them that she is leaving for the US alone, but she is not alone. She is expecting Raj's child. Jahnvi accepts that although Kajal sold her husband, it was she who offered to buy him and thus she too should pay her dues. So, the movie ends with Kajal getting her family back, learning of the importance of family over money, and Jahnvi leaving for New York forever.

Cast 

 Anil Kapoor as Raj Verma
 Sridevi as Kajal Jain Verma
 Urmila Matondkar as Janhvi Sahni Verma (Main Supporting Actress)
 Saeed Jaffrey as Randhir Sahni
 Paresh Rawal as Hasmukhlal Singh Bhagat
 Farida Jalal as Karuna Jain
 Omkar Kapoor as Romesh "Romi" Verma
 Kader Khan as Rakshwant Jain
 Johnny Lever as Harish "Harry" Jain
 Upasana Singh as Seema Bhagat / Vaani Bhagat Jain
Dharmesh Tiwari as Kajal's Lawyer

Special appearance
 Anil Saxena as Vikram Khanna
 Poonam Dhillon as Nisha Khadoria: Kajal's friend
 Dinesh Hingoo as Dr. Manoj Chopra 
 Mehmood Jr. as Champak Raina

Soundtrack 
The album was composed by the duo Nadeem-Shravan and lyrics were penned by Sameer. The whole album attained tremendous popularity. The film's soundtrack album sold twomillion units, making it one of the year's top ten best-selling Bollywood soundtrack albums.

The film's biggest hit song was "Judaai Judaai", also known as "Mujhe Ek Pal Chain Na Aaye". It was copied from "Sanu Ek Pal Chain Na Aave" by Pakistani Qawwali singer Nusrat Fateh Ali Khan. "Meri Zindagi Ek Pyaas" is a copy of "Meri Zindagi Tera Pyar" - an iconic collaboration of Noor Jehan and Nusrat Fateh Ali Khan, penned by Khwaja Parvez.

The song "Pyaar Pyaar Karte Karte" features a sample from the Scatman John track "Scatman (Ski-Ba-Bop-Ba-Dop-Bop)".

Track listings

Awards

References

External links 
 

Hindi remakes of Telugu films
1997 films
1990s Hindi-language films
Films scored by Nadeem–Shravan
Films shot in the Las Vegas Valley
Films shot in Mumbai
1997 romantic drama films
Indian romantic drama films
Films directed by Raj Kanwar